The Volkswagen Phideon is an executive sedan manufactured by the German automobile manufacturer Volkswagen, described by Volkswagen as their "premium class" vehicle. Introduced at the 2016 Geneva Motor Show, the Phideon is aimed at the market in China. Sales officially started in July 2016.

Overview 
The Phideon is the first car under the Volkswagen brand to be based on Volkswagen's MLB platform. It is powered by either a  2.0-litre turbocharged four-cylinder EA888 or a  3.0-litre supercharged V6 EA837 petrol engines and is available with an optional 4motion all-wheel drive system. The 2.0-litre plug-in hybrid version is also available, which was launched in April 2017. The Phideon is also the first Volkswagen model to have a camera-based night vision system.

The Phideon is equipped with the Active Info Display which replaced the conventional instrument cluster, and chauffeur mode which allows passengers to send content to the infotainment system.

Since its launch, the car had been sold 24,471 units in 2018 before dropped to 14,019 cars in 2019.

2021 facelift 
A facelifted Phideon was revealed in the 2020 Guangzhou Auto Show. The facelift introduced an updated front bumper adding chrome inserts and modifying the sections around the fog lamps with the grilles updated with a illuminated badge flanked by an LED daytime running light strip that extends on the sides to meet the redesigned headlamps. The all-wheel drive, V6, and plug-in hybrid options were dropped.

References 

Phideon
Cars introduced in 2016
2020s cars
Executive cars
Sedans
Front-wheel-drive vehicles
All-wheel-drive vehicles
Plug-in hybrid vehicles
Flagship vehicles
Cars of China